Henry Blosser House is a historic home located near Malta Bend, Saline County, Missouri. It was built in 1880, and is a three-story, Second Empire style red-orange brick farmhouse. It features a projecting central pavilion, a bell-cast mansard roof, polychrome shingles, and decorative porches.  Also on the property are two contributing outbuildings and a three-level frame barn.

It was added to the National Register of Historic Places in 1978.

References

Houses on the National Register of Historic Places in Missouri
Second Empire architecture in Missouri
Houses completed in 1880
Buildings and structures in Saline County, Missouri
National Register of Historic Places in Saline County, Missouri